Univer is a Russian sitcom which aired on TNT about the life of students living in a dormitory block in Moscow. The show aired from 2008 to 2011, having a total of 5 seasons and 255 episodes. The show triggered two spin-offs: Univer. New Dorm (started in 2011) and SashaTanya (started in 2013).

Plot 
Son of an oligarch Sylvester Sergeev, Sasha, escaped from a university in England, where he studied finance, and enrolled in the Astronomy Department of the Physics Faculty of MVGU, a university in Moscow. Sylvester wants his son to return to his former life, but Sasha believes that he must achieve everything by himself and refuses financial support from his father. Parallel to this, other students living with Sasha go through various entertaining situations and build long-lasting relationships.

Cast
Andrey Gaydulyan as Sasha Sergeev 
 Valentina Rubtsova as Tanya Arkhipova-Sergeeva
 Maria Kozhevnikova as Alla Grishko
 Vitaly Gogunsky as  Eduard  Kuzmin
 Ararat Keschyan as Arthur  Mikaelyan (season 2-5)
 Alexey Klimushkin as  Silvestr Andreevich Sergeev
 Alexey Gavrilov as Gosha Rudkovsky (season 1, 4–5, guest season 2)
 Larisa Baranova as Lily Volkova (season 4-5)
 Stanislav Yarushin as Anton Martynov (season 5)

Cameo
 Pavel Volya
 Olga Buzova
 Martina Stella
 Garik Martirosyan
 Anfisa Chekhova
 Vladimir Kristovsky
 Sergei Glushko
 Nyusha

References

External links 
  
  Univer at the website  TNT

TNT (Russian TV channel) original programming
2008 Russian television series debuts
2011 Russian television series endings
2000s Russian television series
2010s Russian television series
Russian television sitcoms